Vehicles of Travel is the third album by California Pop music band The Curtains, released in 2004 on the independent, San Francisco-based Frenetic Records label. Personnel on this record includes Chris Cohen and Greg Saunier, both members of the band Deerhoof.

Track listing
 April Gallions
 Medallion Arrangement
 Fletcher’s Favorite
 A Sudden Prospect
 Kites for Rookies
 Won’t Make It
 Personal Resources
 Feeling Station
 Ringmaster’s Reverie
 Observation Towers
 Crooked Weapon
 Cops in Cologne
 The Cobbler’s Key
 Nite Crew
 Hooligans
 City of Paris
 The Gadabouts
 Seabreeze Melody
 Soopeaters!
 Pagoda Defenders
 The Bronx Zoobreak
 Unmentionable
 Chestnut Kid Returns

Personnel

 Chris Cohen – vocals, guitar, bass, keyboards, drums
 Andrew Maxwell - vocals, drums, guitar
 Greg Saunier - vocals, keyboards

References

2004 albums
The Curtains albums